1304 Arosa, provisional designation , is a metallic asteroid from the outer region of the asteroid belt, approximately 40 kilometers in diameter. It was discovered on 21 May 1928, by German astronomer Karl Reinmuth at Heidelberg Observatory in southwest Germany. It was named after the Swiss mountain village of Arosa.

Orbit and classification 

Arosa is a non-family asteroid from the main belt's background population. It orbits the Sun in the outer asteroid belt at a distance of 2.8–3.6 AU once every 5 years and 9 months (2,089 days; semi-major axis of 3.20 AU). Its orbit has an eccentricity of 0.12 and an inclination of 19° with respect to the ecliptic.

Physical characteristics 

In the SMASS taxonomy, Arosa is classified as a generic X-type asteroid. The Wide-field Infrared Survey Explorer (WISE) groups it into the metallic M-type asteroid subcategory.

Rotation period 

Several rotational lightcurves were obtained from photometric observations between 2002 and 2006. Lightcurve analysis gave a well-defined rotation period of 7.74 hours with a brightness amplitude between 0.32 and 0.38 magnitude.

Diameter and albedo 

According to the surveys carried out by the Infrared Astronomical Satellite IRAS, the Japanese Akari satellite, and NASA's WISE space telescope with its NEOWISE mission, Arosa measures between 31.47 and 57.443 kilometers in diameter, and its surface has an albedo between 0.1961 and 0.409. The Collaborative Asteroid Lightcurve Link derives an albedo of 0.2125 and a diameter of 41.67 kilometers, using an absolute magnitude of 9.2.

Naming 

This minor planet was named for the Swiss mountain village of Arosa, a summer and a winter tourist resort in the Swiss Alps. The official naming citation was also mentioned in The Names of the Minor Planets by Paul Herget in 1955.

References

External links 
 Asteroid Lightcurve Database (LCDB), query form (info )
 Dictionary of Minor Planet Names, Google books
 Asteroids and comets rotation curves, CdR – Observatoire de Genève, Raoul Behrend
 Discovery Circumstances: Numbered Minor Planets (1)-(5000) – Minor Planet Center
 
 

001304
Discoveries by Karl Wilhelm Reinmuth
Named minor planets
001304
19280521